Wajib Ali is an Indian politician belonging to Indian National Congress. He was elected as a legislator from BSP in Nagar in Rajasthan Legislative Assembly in 2018.

References 

1982 births
Living people
Rajasthan MLAs 2018–2023
Bahujan Samaj Party politicians
Indian National Congress politicians from Rajasthan